Marc Pubill Pagès (born 30 June 2003) is a Spanish professional footballer who plays as a right back for Levante UD.

Club career
Born in Terrassa, Barcelona, Catalonia, Pubill represented CE Manresa, RCD Espanyol, Club Gimnàstic Manresa and Levante UD as a youth. On 13 December 2020, while still a youth, he made his senior debut with the latter's reserves by playing the last 11 minutes of a 1–0 Segunda División B home loss against Hércules CF.

Pubill scored his first senior goal on 17 October 2021, netting the B's third in a 3–0 away win over the same opponent. On 3 December, he renewed his contract with the club until 2026.

Pubill made his first team – and La Liga – debut on 20 December 2021, starting in a 4–3 home loss against rivals Valencia CF.

International career
Pubill represented Spain at under-19 level, receiving his first call up to the side in October 2021.

References

External links
 
 
 

2003 births
Living people
Footballers from Terrassa
Spanish footballers
Association football fullbacks
La Liga players
Segunda Federación players
Segunda División B players
Atlético Levante UD players
Levante UD footballers
Spain youth international footballers